The Norwegian Fishing Village Museum (Norsk Fiskeværsmuseum) is a museum devoted to Norwegian fishing in the village of Å in the municipality of Moskenes  in Lofoten in northern Norway.

Overview
The museum was founded on July 3, 1987, by the Moskenes History and Museum Society in collaboration with the Moskenes municipal council and Sigurd Harald Ellingsen. It was officially opened in June 1988 and has been receiving public grants since 1990. Several buildings offer varied exhibitions. The main themes are life in Lofoten Fishery over the past 200 years. The prime focus of the museum  is life in the fishing village from approx. 1840 to 1960.

Gallery

See also
Lofoten Stockfish Museum

References

External links
Norsk Fiskeværsmuseum website

Museums in Nordland
Industry museums in Norway
Moskenes
Maritime museums in Norway
Fishing museums
Fishing in Norway